Opie may refer to:

Opie (name), a list of people and fictional characters with the given name, nickname, or surname
 Acronyms OPIE:
 OPIE (Entomology) (Office pour l'Information Eco-entomologique), a French government organisation devoted to entomology
 OPIE Authentication System, a one-time password authentication system for Unix based on S/KEY

See also
Okey
Okie
opy, ISO 639-3 code for the Ofayé language of Brazil